Betsy and Tacy Go Over the Big Hill (1942) is the third volume in the Betsy-Tacy series by Maud Hart Lovelace. The book, along with the entire Betsy-Tacy and Deep Valley series, was republished in 2000 by HarperTrophy with a new cover art illustrated by Michael Koelsch.

Plot overview
While the first two volumes are something like collections of vignettes about Betsy, Tacy, and Tib, this one has a story through the whole volume.

The girls are competing with Betsy's and Tacy's older sisters about having a Queen of Summer.  When they go out to collect votes, they find themselves making friends with a surprising little girl their own age in the Little Syria section of Deep Valley, Minnesota.

Trivia
Betsy and Tacy first sing their "Cat Duet" at the school entertainment in this book.

References

Betsy-Tacy
1942 American novels
Novels set in Minnesota
1942 children's books
Thomas Y. Crowell Co. books